Republicans for Immigration Reform is a SuperPAC which aims at pushing for immigration reform in the United States and improving the Republican Party’s standing among Hispanics.

Promoted in early 2012 by former US Secretary of Commerce Carlos Gutierrez, its advocates hope it will help repair the political damage left by years of anti-illegal-immigrant rhetoric that has dominated GOP primaries and alienated crucial Hispanic voters. Gutierrez believes that "the far right of this party has taken the party to a place that it doesn't belong".

See also

 Immigration to the United States
 S. 2611
 DREAM Act

References

External links
 Republicans for Immigration Reform
 
 

United States immigration law
Immigration political advocacy groups in the United States
Republican Party (United States) organizations
Political organizations established in 2012
2012 establishments in the United States